Indian football clubs have entered Asian football competitions (AFC Champions League and AFC Cup) since the 1900s. The Asian Champion Club Tournament started in 1967, but there was no Indian representative during that inaugural season. Indian teams have participated every year in Asia, except for the early years between the 1990s and early 2000s.

Slots

Full Asian record

AFC Champions League/Asian Club Championship/Asian Champion Club Tournament

1 Santhosh Trophy winners entered tournament . 
2 Federation Cup winners entered tournament.

AFC Women's Club Championship

1 As the 2020–21 Indian Women's League season is cancelled, so Gokulam Kerala, the 2019–20 Indian Women's League season champions qualified for the event.

Asian Cup Winners' Cup

1 Mohammedan SC withdrew. 
2 East Bengal withdrew after first leg.

AFC Cup

Opponents

Head-to-head records against clubs form 35 nations whom they have played to date only in AFC Competitions.

Last Updated on 23 September 2021.

Top scorers

See also 
 AFC Champions League
 AFC Cup
 Indian Super League
 I-League
 Indian football league system
 Australian clubs in the AFC Champions League
 Bangladeshi football clubs in the Asian Club Championship
 Bangladeshi clubs in the AFC Cup
 Chinese clubs in the AFC Champions League
 Indonesian football clubs in Asian competitions
 Iranian clubs in the AFC Champions League
 Iraqi clubs in the AFC Champions League
 Japanese clubs in the AFC Champions League
 Myanmar clubs in the AFC Champions League
 Qatari clubs in the AFC Champions League
 Saudi Arabian clubs in the AFC Champions League
 South Korean clubs in the AFC Champions League
 Thai clubs in the AFC Champions League
 Vietnamese clubs in the AFC Champions League

References

I-League
 
Indian Super League